The Welsh Football League Division One, known as the Nathanielcars.co.uk Welsh League First Division for sponsorship reasons, was a football league in South Wales. It formed the top division of the Welsh Football League and the second level of the Welsh football league system until the 2019–20 season when it was replaced by the Cymru South.  From the 2019–20 season it operated at the third level of the Welsh football league system. 

If the team which finished top of the Division had good enough ground facilities, it was promoted to the Welsh Premier League and was replaced by one of the two teams finishing bottom of the Premiership. If the Division champions' ground did not meet Premiership standards, then the team which finished second may have been promoted. The team which finished in bottom position was relegated to the Welsh Football League Division Two.

From its inception in 1904 it had always been the top flight of the Welsh League, or the Rhymney Valley League and Glamorgan League as it was known until 1912. This division changed its name on numerous occasions, which includes Premier Division and National Division.

In 1992 it became level two of the Welsh Football Pyramid following the creation of the Welsh Premier League.

In 2019 it became level three of the Welsh Football Pyramid following the creation of the Cymru South. It folded in 2020 after the Football Association of Wales took over the running of tier 3 leagues and the responsibility for tier 4 passed to regional football associations.

Member clubs for the final 2019–20 season

 Aberbargoed Buds
 Abergavenny Town
 AFC Llwydcoed
 Bridgend Street
 Caldicot Town
 Croesyceiliog
 Dinas Powys
 Garden Village
 Goytre 
 Monmouth Town
 Penydarren BGC 
 Pontardawe Town
 Port Talbot Town
 Risca United
 Ton Pentre 
 Trefelin BGC

Top Division of the Welsh League (1904–1992)
Since its inception in 1904 it has always been the top flight of the Welsh League for the teams located in South Wales. 
This division has changed its name on numerous occasions.

Performance by club
22 Clubs won Top Division of the Welsh League (1904–1992) in South Wales.

Welsh Football League Division One (1992–2019)
In 1992 it became level two of the Welsh Football Pyramid following the creation of the Welsh Premier League.

Performance by club

Welsh Football League Division One (2019–2020)
In 2019 it became level three of the Welsh Football Pyramid following the creation of the Cymru South.

References

See also
Football in Wales
Welsh football league system
Welsh Cup
Welsh League Cup
FAW Premier Cup
List of football clubs in Wales
List of stadiums in Wales by capacity

1
2
Wales
2020 disestablishments in Wales
Sports leagues disestablished in 2020
Defunct football competitions in Wales
Sports leagues established in 1904